A. Duda & Sons refers to various agricultural and real estate developments, with ranches in Central Florida, Texas, and California.

The company grows vegetables, citrus, sugarcane, and other crops, and raises cattle. It is best known as one of the top growers of celery in the United States. It markets produce using the Dandy label.

It has significant land holdings in Florida, California and Texas. It has developed some of this land for residential and commercial use. The Viera Company subsidiary oversees the development and management of Viera, Florida, a planned community in Brevard County, Florida, which had 16,000 residents in 2007.

Operations
Operations include vegetable and melon farming; orange groves; other citrus  Groves; Nursery and Tree Production; Sugarcane Farming; Beef Cattle Ranching and Farming; Commercial and Institutional Building Construction; Land Subdivision;  Sugar Manufacturing; Sugarcane Mills; Fresh Fruit and Vegetable Merchandising Wholesalers.

History
Andrew Duda immigrated to United States from Slovakia.

The family diversified into beef cattle ranching at their Cocoa Ranch, near Cocoa, Florida. By the 1970s, it had 20,000 cattle.

The business was incorporated in 1953.

The company revenues were $200 million in the 1980s.

References

External links 
 

Brevard County, Florida
Landmarks in Florida
Ranches in Florida